Ewald Emile Barron (10 April 1937 – 13 April 2015) was a Surinamese footballer who played as a goalkeeper for S.V. Transvaal in the Surinamese Hoofdklasse and for the Suriname national team.

Club career
Born in Paramaribo, Barron played for S.V. Transvaal in the Surinamese Hoofdklasse, becoming the first choice keeper in his first season with the first team in 1959. He won a total of 9 national championships with Transvaal, winning trophies in 1962, 1965 to 1970, 1973 and 1974. The Goalkeeper of the Year award in Suriname is awarded to the goalkeeper who concedes the fewest goals, with Barron winning the award on 6 occasions. From 1964 to 1968 and in 1970.

In 1968, Barron helped Transvaal to the finals of the CONCACAF Champions' Cup helping to beat Aurora F.C. from Guatemala 3–1 on aggregate score. The final against Toluca from Mexico however was cancelled, and Transvaal disqualified due to supporters of both clubs invading the pitch in a brawl during the semi-finals. In 1973, Barron helped Transvaal win the country's first CONCACAF Champions' Cup after both Costa Rican clubs L.D. Alajuelense and Saprissa withdrew in what would be the club's most successful season to date. That year Transvaal went on to win the Hoofdklasse undefeated, as well as going undefeated in the club's first successful continental race. Three years later Barron retired from football and moved to the Netherlands.

International career
Barron has represented the Suriname national team during his career, having made his debut in 1959. He was the first choice keeper for the country's 1966 and 1970 FIFA World Cup qualification process. On 24 November 1968 he kept a clean sheet against the Netherlands Antilles in a 6–0 win at the National Stadion.

Honours

Club
S.V. Transvaal
Hoofdklasse (9): 1962, 1965, 1966, 1967, 1968, 1969, 1970, 1973, 1974
CONCACAF Champions' Cup (1): 1973

Individual
Surinamese Goalkeeper of the Year (6): 1964, 1965, 1966, 1967, 1968, 1970

References

1937 births
2015 deaths
Surinamese footballers
Suriname international footballers
S.V. Transvaal players
SVB Eerste Divisie players
Association football goalkeepers
Sportspeople from Paramaribo
Surinamese emigrants to the Netherlands